Nicole Höchst (born 10 February 1970) is a German politician for the Alternative for Germany (AfD) and since 2017 member of the Bundestag. Her positions are described by various interest groups as homophobic and hostile, which Höchst disputes.

Life and politics
Höchst was born 1970 in the West German town of Homburg (Saar) and became a teacher.

Höchst entered the AfD in 2015 and became after the 2017 German federal election a member of the Bundestag. She is a member of the Committee for Education, Research and Technology Assessment and the Committee on Family, Senior Citizens, Women and Youth. Her daughter is a member of the youth city council in Speyer, and has been accused of using racist comments to further her mother's political campaigns.

References

Members of the Bundestag for Rhineland-Palatinate
Politicians from Saarland
People from Homburg, Saarland
1970 births
Living people
Members of the Bundestag 2021–2025
Members of the Bundestag 2017–2021
Members of the Bundestag for the Alternative for Germany
Female members of the Bundestag
21st-century German women politicians